The Prayer for the Welfare of the State of Israel is a prayer said in Religious Zionist and Conservative synagogues on Shabbat and Jewish holy days. The prayer requests divine providence for the State of Israel and its leaders, and that the exiled Jewish people be gathered in to the Land of Israel.

History 

The prayer was instituted in 1948 by the Sephardic and Ashkenazic Chief Rabbis of the newly formed State of Israel, respectively Rabbis Ben-Zion Meir Hai Uziel and Yitzhak HaLevi Herzog. The prayer was originally published in the newspaper HaTzofe on September 20, 1948, and in Haaretz on the following day. Over the years it was assumed that Nobel laureate S. Y. Agnon was the one who actually composed the prayer, but researcher Yoel Rappel showed that Agnon was only asked to assist in composing it. This was confirmed by Agnon's son Hemdat.

The prayer was written as a replacement for the Prayer for the Welfare of the Government, which was commonly said in Diaspora communities. That prayer included requests for the welfare of the government of the country of residence, the King, Caesar, or Tzar and/or heir to the throne and their immediate family. The recommendation to say such a prayer is found in Pirkei Avot 3:2.

At times when there have been ill relations between the Religious Zionist community and the government of Israel, particularly during the period between the signing of the Oslo Accords until the assassination of Yitzhak Rabin, as well as during the disengagement from Gaza, some refrained from reciting this prayer, or inserted changes which expressed their outrage at the State's leadership. One of the most common changes was to replace the words "...and send Your Light and Your Truth to its leaders, its officers and advisers, and set them aright with Your good counsel" with "stand at its head men of valor, God-fearers, men of truth who hate avarice, and send Your Light and Your Truth upon them."

Liturgy 

In the prayer, the State of Israel is called "the beginning of the emergence of our redemption." This phrase, and reservations about the secular governance of Israel, are some of the reasons why Haredi Jews in the main do not say this prayer. In practice, the recitation of this prayer, and to a lesser extent the Prayer for the Welfare of the Soldiers of the IDF, has become one of the differences delineating the Haredim from the Religious Zionists.

Ashkenazi Jews recite the prayer between the recitation of the haftarah and the returning of the Torah scroll(s) to the Holy Ark. Sephardi and Mizrahi Jews, however, usually recite it at the time when the Torah scroll(s) are taken out of the Ark. At these respective points, it was common practice throughout the years to add various blessings, including the Blessing for the Ruler of the Country. After the establishment of Israel, some synagogues also read a prayer for the welfare of the President of Israel, but this practice has virtually ceased today.

The Prayer for the State of Israel has a tune which is often used, and some synagogues sing a different, festive tune on holidays. The congregation stands while the leader reads the prayer, and in some synagogues everyone reads it aloud.

See also 
 List of Jewish prayers and blessings

External links 

 English translations: 

Conservative Zionism
Religious Zionism
Jewish prayer and ritual texts